The choroid, also known as the choroidea or choroid coat, is a part of the uvea, the vascular layer of the eye, and contains connective tissues, and lies between the retina and the sclera.  The human choroid is thickest at the far extreme rear of the eye (at 0.2 mm), while in the outlying areas it narrows to 0.1 mm. The choroid provides oxygen and nourishment to the outer layers of the retina.  Along with the ciliary body and iris, the choroid forms the uveal tract.

The structure of the choroid is generally divided into four layers (classified in order of furthest away from the retina to closest):
Haller's layer - outermost layer of the choroid consisting of larger diameter blood vessels;
Sattler's layer - layer of medium diameter blood vessels;
Choriocapillaris - layer of capillaries; and
Bruch's membrane (synonyms: Lamina basalis, Complexus basalis, Lamina vitra) - innermost layer of the choroid.

Blood supply 
There are two circulations of the eye:  the retinal (in the retina) and uveal, supplied in humans by posterior ciliary arteries, originating from the ophthalmic artery (a branch of the internal carotid artery).  The arteries of the uveal circulation, supplying the uvea and outer and middle layers of the retina, are branches of the ophthalmic artery and enter the eyeball without passing with the optic nerve.  The retinal circulation, on the other hand, derives its circulation from the central retinal artery, also a branch of the ophthalmic artery, but passing in conjunction with the optic nerve.  They branch in a segmental distribution to end arterioles and not anastomoses. This is clinically significant for diseases affecting  choroidal blood supply. The macula responsible for central vision and  the anterior part of the optic nerve are dependent on choroidal blood supply. The structure of choroidal vessels can be revealed by optical coherence tomography, and blood flow can be revealed by Indocyanine green angiography, and laser Doppler imaging.

In bony fish
Teleosts bear a body of capillary adjacent to the optic nerve called the choroidal gland. Though its function is not known, it is believed to be a supplemental oxygen carrier.

Mechanism
Melanin, a dark colored pigment, helps the choroid limit uncontrolled reflection within the eye that would potentially result in the perception of confusing images.

In humans and most other primates, melanin occurs throughout the choroid. In albino humans, frequently melanin is absent and vision is low.  In many animals, however, the partial absence of melanin contributes to superior night vision. In these animals, melanin is absent from a section of the choroid and within that section a layer of highly reflective tissue, the tapetum lucidum, helps to collect light by reflecting it in a controlled manner.  The uncontrolled reflection of light from dark choroid produces the photographic red-eye effect on photos, whereas the controlled reflection of light from the tapetum lucidum produces eyeshine (see Tapetum lucidum).

History
The choroid was first described by Democritus (c. 460 – c. 370 BCE) around 400 BCE, calling it the "chitoon
malista somphos" (more spongy tunic [than the sclera]). Democritus likely saw the choroid from dissections of animal eyes.

About 100 years later, Herophilos (c. 335 – 280 BCE) also described the choroid from his dissections on eyes of cadavers.

Clinical significance
Choroid is the most common site for metastasis in the eye due to its extensive vascular supply. The origin of the metastases are usually from breast cancer, lung cancer, gastrointestinal cancer, and kidney cancer. Bilateral choroidal metastases are usually due to breast cancer, Meanwhile, unilateral metastasis is due to lung cancer. Choroidal metastases should be differentiated from uveal melanoma, where the latter is a primary tumour arising from the choroid itself.

See also
Chorioretinitis
Uveitis

Additional images

References

External links
 

Human eye anatomy
Visual system